The Rural Municipality of Westbourne is a former rural municipality (RM) in the Canadian province of Manitoba. It was originally incorporated as a rural municipality on December 1, 1877. It ceased on January 1, 2015 as a result of its provincially mandated amalgamation with the RM of Lakeview and the Town of Gladstone to form the Municipality of WestLake – Gladstone.

Communities 
 Colby
 Golden Stream
 Katrime
 Muir
 Ogilvie
 Plumas
 Westbourne
 Woodside

References

External links 
 
 Map of Westbourne R.M. at Statcan

Westbourne
Populated places disestablished in 2015
2015 disestablishments in Manitoba